Visman is a village in Iran. It may also refer to:

Bart Visman (born 1962), Dutch composer
Jan Visman (1914–2006), Dutch statistician